René Jørgensen (born 26 July 1975) is a former road bicycle racer from Denmark.

Career
He rode for the Danish professional cycling team, which he joined in 1998. He left the team, which by that time had changed the name twice; 2000 season to Memory Card – Jack & Jones and from 2001 to CSC – Tiscali after the 2001 season, where he decided to join another Danish team: EDS-Fakta. The team changed its name to Team Fakta, and he rode for the team until it closed in 2003. He went to the Italian team , which, however, also closed, at the end of the 2004 season. In 2005, he signed with the South African team, which he represented for a single season, before he returned to Denmark to ride for the UCI Continental team, with whom he remained with until the end of 2010.

Major results

1993
 2nd Overall Grand Prix Rüebliland
1997
 2nd Road race, National Under-23 Road Championships
2000
 9th Overall Tour Down Under
2001
 10th Overall Tour de Langkawi
2002
 4th Overall Tour de Langkawi
 4th Grand Prix de Wallonie
 6th GP Aarhus
2003
 2nd Sparkassen Giro Bochum
 7th Paris–Camembert
2004
 8th Overall Tour de Luxembourg
2005
 3rd GP Aarhus
 10th Ronde van Drenthe
2006
 3rd Grand Prix Cristal Energie
 3rd Grand Prix Demy-Cars
 10th Boucle de l'Artois
2007
 2nd Boucle de l'Artois
 2nd Ronde van Drenthe
 2nd GP Herning
 5th Grand Prix Cristal Energie
 6th Grote Prijs Jef Scherens
 6th Overall Rhône-Alpes Isère Tour
2008
 4th Road race, National Road Championships
 6th Overall Paris–Corrèze
2009
 1st GP Herning
 6th Grand Prix des Marbriers
2010
 2nd Overall Ronde de l'Oise
2011
 6th GP Herning
2012
 3rd Ronde van Drenthe

External links

Photo: http://autobus.cyclingnews.com/photos/1998/aug/renej.jpg

1975 births
Living people
Danish male cyclists
People from Herning Municipality
Sportspeople from the Central Denmark Region